André a Cara e a Coragem is a Brazilian drama film, produced in 1971 and directed by Xavier de Oliveira.

Cast
Stepan Nercessian
Angela Valerio
Antonio Patiño
Maria Regina
Ecchio Reis
Ilva Niño
Pichin Plá
Edil Magliari
Maria Rita
José de Freitas

References

1971 films
Brazilian drama films
1970s Portuguese-language films
1971 drama films